FC Tobol is a Kazakh professional football club based at the Central Stadium in Kostanay. They have been members of the Kazakhstan Premier League since its foundation in 1992. They won the Kazakhstan Premier League in 2010, and finished no lower than fourth place between the 2002 and 2010 seasons. In 2021 they won the title for the second time.

History
Following a surprise defeat to Kyzylzhar in the 2016 Kazakhstan Cup, manager Dmitriy Ogai left the club by mutual consent, with Oleg Lotov being appointed as interim manager on 30 April 2016. Lotov was replaced with Omari Tetradze as the club's manager on 30 May 2016.

Prior to the start of the season, Vladimir Nikitenko was appointed as Tobol's manager following the expiration of Robert Yevdokimov's contract. On 1 August, Vladimir Nikitenko resigned as manager after Tobol were eliminated from the Europa League. Andrei Miroshnichenko was appointed as Caretaker manager before Marek Zub was announced as Tobol's new manager on 6 August 2018. 
On 31 December 2018, Zub left Tobol after his contract wasn't renewed, and Vladimir Gazzayev was appointed as the club's new manager. Gazzayev resigned as manager on 21 July 2019 after Tobol were eliminated from the 2019–20 UEFA Europa League by Jeunesse Esch.

On 14 December 2019, Grigori Babayan was appointed as manager of FC Tobol. On 17 June 2021, Babayan left his role as Head Coach by mutual consent to take up a coaching role at CSKA Moscow. The following day, 18 June 2021, Alexander Moskalenko has appointed as Acting Head Coach. On 16 May 2022, Moskalenko left his role at Tobol, with Milan Milanović being appointed as the clubs new Head Coach on 20 May 2022.

On 10 January 2023, Milić Ćurčić was appointed as the new Head Coach of Tobol.

Names
1967 : Founded as Avtomobilist
1982 : Renamed Energetik
1990 : Renamed Kustanayets
1992 : Renamed Khimik
1995 : Renamed Tobol

Domestic history

Continental history
Tobol performed remarkably in their first European appearance, reaching the third round of the Intertoto Cup 2003. They beat Polonia Warszawa and Sint-Truiden, and lost to SV Pasching. In UEFA Cup 2006-07 FC Basel were hard nuts to crack for Tobol. They won the Intertoto Cup 2007, defeating FC Zestafoni, Slovan Liberec and OFI Crete and advanced to 2nd qualifying round of UEFA Cup 2007-08.

Legend: GF = Goals For. GA = Goals Against. GD = Goal Difference.

Honours
Kazakhstan Premier League 
Winners (2): 2010, 2021
Kazakhstan Cup
Winners (1): 2007
Kazakhstan Super Cup
Winners (2): 2021, 2022
UEFA Intertoto Cup
Winners (1): 2007

Current squad

Managers

 Mykhaylo Olefirenko (2002)
 Vladimir Mukhanov (2003–04)
 Dmitriy Ogai (1 January 2005 – 31 December 2009)
 Ravil Sabitov (3 December 2009 – 22 May 2011)
 Sergei Petrenko (1 June 2011 – 19 September 2011)
 Vyacheslav Hroznyi (12 December 2011 – 31 December 2012)
 Timur Urazov (1 January 2013 – 31 December 2013)
 Sergei Maslenov (1 January 2014 – 22 April 2014)
 Vardan Minasyan (23 April 2014 – 16 April 2015)
 Sergei Maslenov (16 April 2015 – December 2015)
 Dmitriy Ogai (21 December 2015 – 28 April 2016)
 Oleg Lotov (Interim) (30 April 2016 – 30 May 2016)
 Omari Tetradze (30 May 2016 – 27 June 2017)
 Robert Yevdokimov (7 July 2017 – 25 December 2017)
 Vladimir Nikitenko (January 2018 – 1 August 2018)
 Andrei Miroshnichenko (1–6 August 2018)
 Marek Zub (6 August 2018 – 31 December 2018)
 Vladimir Gazzayev (31 December 2018 – 21 July 2019 )
 Nurbol Zhumaskaliyev  (22 July – 14 December 2019)
 Grigori Babayan (14 December 2019 - 17 June 2021)
 Alexander Moskalenko  (18 June 2021 – 16 May 2022)
 Milan Milanović (20 May 2022 – 24 December 2022)
 Milić Ćurčić (10 January 2023 – present)

See also
 Kazakhstani football clubs in European competitions

References

External links
 Official site

 
Football clubs in Kazakhstan
Association football clubs established in 1967
1967 establishments in the Kazakh Soviet Socialist Republic